Bithynia siamensis is a species of a freshwater snail with a gill and an operculum, an aquatic prosobranch gastropod mollusk in the family Bithyniidae.

Subspecies 
WHO (1995) recognized the following subspecies:
 Bithynia siamensis siamensis - synonym: Bithynia siamensis goniomphalus
 Bithynia siamensis funiculata
 Bithynia siamensis laevis

Bithynia siamensis and Bithynia funiculata (synonym: Bithynia goniomphala) were recognized as separate species in the 2012 IUCN Red List.

Distribution 
This species occurs in:
 Cambodia
 Laos
 Malaysia
 Myanmar
 Thailand
 Vietnam

The population of Bithynia siamensis fluctuates during the year.

Parasites 
Bithynia siamensis serves as a first intermediate host for Southeast Asian liver fluke Opisthorchis viverrini. The number of excretory cells of the digestive system is increased in infected Bithynia siamensis.

Parasites of Bithynia siamensis include trematode Multicotyle purvisi.

References

 .

Further reading

External links 

 https://web.archive.org/web/20110723214250/http://www.news.kku.ac.th/eng/news/content/view/134/1/

Bithyniidae
Gastropods described in 1856